The Guild of Saint Thomas and Saint Luke, founded in 1863 during the first of the Malines Congresses, was a Belgian association for the study and promotion of Medieval art from a Christian perspective.

Activities
Papers were read at the regular meetings, scholarships were funded, and the guild made an annual study trip. In 1867 the guild organized an exhibition of medieval art in Bruges. Until 1913, it published an annual Bulletin.

Members
The founders, Jean-Baptiste Bethune and William Henry James Weale, were both influential figures in the Gothic Revival in Belgium. The first president of the guild was the clergyman-scholar Charles-Joseph Voisin, with international vice-presidents Joseph Albert Alberdingk Thijm (from the Netherlands) and Franz Johann Joseph Bock (from Germany). Jules Helbig also quickly became an influential member.

Arthur Verhaegen joined the guild in 1874 and helped organise that year's study trip, which was to Hasselt, Maaseik and Diest. In 1881 he became editor of the Bulletin, and in 1884 secretary.

Publications
Gilde de Saint-Thomas et de Saint-Luc, Bulletin des séances (1871) on Google Books
Gilde de Saint-Thomas et de Saint-Luc, Bulletin des séances (1874) on Google Books

References

Further reading
 Ellen Van Impe, "Regionalism, Rationalism and Modernity in the Early Twentieth-Century St Luke Movement", in Sources of Regionalism in the Nineteenth Century: Architecture, Art, and Literature, edited by Linda Van Santvoort and Tom Verschaffel (Leuven University Press, 2008), pp. 139-160.

1863 establishments in Belgium